SMTC Corporation (Surface Mount Technology Centre), founded in 1985, is a mid-size provider of end-to-end electronics manufacturing services (EMS) including PCBA production, systems integration and comprehensive testing services, enclosure fabrication, as well as product design, sustaining engineering and supply chain management services. SMTC facilities span a broad footprint in the United States, Canada, Mexico, and China, with more than 2,300 employees. SMTC services extend over the entire electronic product life cycle from the development and introduction of new products through to the growth, maturity and end-of-life phases. SMTC offers fully integrated contract manufacturing services with a distinctive approach to global original equipment manufacturers (OEMs) and emerging technology companies primarily within industrial, computing and communication market segments. SMTC was recognized in 2012 by Frost & Sullivan with the Global EMS Award for Product Quality Leadership and 2013 with the North American Growth Leadership Award in the EMS industry, as one of the fastest growth companies in 2012.

History
 1985 - Surface Mount founded in Toronto, Ontario
 1990 - HTM established in Denver, Colorado
 1997 - acquires Ogden Atlantic Design in Charlotte, North Carolina
 July 1999 - merger of Surface Mount and HTM
 1999 - purchased Zenith Electronics' facility in Chihuahua, Mexico, SMTC's only site with unionized employees
 September 1999 - acquired W. F. Wood of Boston, Massachusetts
 July 2000 - acquired EMS company, Pensar Electronic Solutions of Appleton, Wisconsin
 July 21, 2000 - IPO
 November 2000 - acquired Qualtron Teoranta of Donegal, Ireland, and subsidiary in Haverhill, Massachusetts
 March 2002 - Closed down its Cork City, Ireland manufacturing plant with the loss of 200 jobs due to its main customer going into administration. 
 August 2003 - Sold EMS company, Pensar Electronics Solutions of Appleton, Wisconsin back to the original owners. The original owners decided to buy the company back after hearing plans that SMTC was planning on shutting the plant down.
February 2010 - SMTC regained compliance with Nasdaq requirements, after Nasdaq notified the company for failing to maintain a minimum bid price of $1.00 on September 15, 2009.
November 8, 2018 - acquires contract manufacturer MC Assembly 
April 2021 - H.I.G. Capital acquired SMTC for US $172 million and its stock was delisted from Nasdaq.

External links
 Company website

References

Companies formerly listed on the Nasdaq
Electronics companies of Canada
Companies based in Markham, Ontario